Williams County Airport is a public-use general aviation airport serving Bryan, Ohio.

Airports in Ohio
Bryan, Ohio